There are 37 scheduled monuments in Greater Manchester, a metropolitan county in North West England. In the United Kingdom, a scheduled monument is a "nationally important" archaeological site or historic building that has been given protection against unauthorised change by being placed on a list (or "schedule") by the Secretary of State for Digital Culture, Media and Sport; Historic England recommends sites for scheduling to the Secretary of State. Scheduled monuments are defined in the Ancient Monuments and Archaeological Areas Act 1979 and the National Heritage Act 1983. There are nearly 20,000 entries on the schedule, which is maintained by Historic England as part of the National Heritage List for England; more than one site can be included in a single entry. While a scheduled monument can also be recognised as a listed building, Historic England's aim is to set the most appropriate form of protection in place for the building or site. Applications to deschedule a site are administered Historic England, who will carry out an assessment and make a recommendation to the Secretary of State.

The metropolitan county of Greater Manchester is composed of 10 metropolitan boroughs: Bolton, Bury, Manchester, Oldham, Rochdale, Salford, Stockport, Tameside, Trafford and Wigan. Rochdale has no scheduled monuments; those in the other boroughs are listed separately. They range from prehistoric structures – the oldest of which date from the Bronze Age – to more modern structures such as the Astley Green Colliery, from 1908. Greater Manchester has seven prehistoric monuments (i.e. Bronze or Iron Age), found in Bury, Oldham, Salford, Stockport, and Tameside. The Bronze Age sites are mainly cairns and barrows, and both the Iron Age sites are military in nature, promontory forts.

The trend of military sites continues from the Iron Age into the Roman period; two Roman forts in Greater Manchester are scheduled monuments and were the two main areas of Roman activity in the county. Of the nine castles in Greater Manchester, four are scheduled monuments: Buckton Castle, Watch Hill Castle, Bury Castle, and Radcliffe Tower. The last two are fortified manor houses, and although defined as castles were not exclusively military in nature; they probably acted as the administrative centre of the manors they were in. There are several other manor houses and country houses – some with moats – in the county that are protected as scheduled monuments. The Astley Green Colliery, the Marple Aqueduct, Oldknows Limekilns, and the Worsley Delph are scheduled relics of Greater Manchester's industrial history.

See also

Architecture of Manchester
Castles in Greater Manchester
Conservation in the United Kingdom
Grade I listed buildings in Greater Manchester
Grade II* listed buildings in Greater Manchester
List of tallest buildings in Manchester

Notes
Most references are to one main body of sources: Pastscape which is funded by English Heritage and has information on nearly 400,000 archaeological sites and buildings in England. "The information on PastScape is derived from the National Monuments Record database which holds records on the architectural and archaeological heritage of England. The National Monuments Record is the public archive of English Heritage."
Nico Ditch is a linear earthwork that runs for about  generally east to west. It forms part of the Manchester–Tameside border and the Manchester–Stockport border. It passes through Tameside and Manchester and extends into Trafford as far as Stretford.

References

Bibliography

Archaeological sites in Greater Manchester
 
 
 
Scheduled
Greater Manchester